Cherry County is a county located in the U.S. state of Nebraska. As of the 2020 United States Census, the population was 5,455. Its county seat is Valentine. The county was named for Lt. Samuel A. Cherry, an Army officer who was stationed at Fort Niobrara and who had been killed in South Dakota in 1881. Cherry County is in the Nebraska Sandhills. It is the largest county in the state at nearly 6,000 square miles (15,500 sq km), larger than the state of Connecticut.

In the Nebraska license plate system, Cherry County is represented by the prefix 66 (it had the 66th-largest number of vehicles registered in the state when the license plate system was established in 1922).

Geography
Cherry County lies on the north side of Nebraska. Its north boundary line abuts the south boundary line of the state of South Dakota. It is by far Nebraska's largest county in land area and larger than the state of Connecticut, or the states of Delaware and Rhode Island combined. The county is in Nebraska's Sandhills region; the dunes that give the region its name are a result of the most recent glacial period, the Pinedale glaciation. During the Holocene glacial retreat the sand dunes, which had been deposited in their current location by the vast continental glaciers, were exposed and grasses eventually took over.

Major highways

  U.S. Highway 20
  U.S. Highway 83
  Nebraska Highway 12
  Nebraska Highway 61
  Nebraska Highway 97

National protected areas

 Fort Niobrara National Wildlife Refuge
 Fort Niobrara Wilderness
 Niobrara National Scenic River (part)
 Samuel R. McKelvie National Forest
 Valentine National Wildlife Refuge

State protected areas
 Bowring Ranch State Historical Park
 Cottonwood Lake State Recreation Area
 Merritt Reservoir State Recreation Area 
 Smith Falls State Park

Adjacent counties
Owing to its size as Nebraska's largest county by area, Cherry County borders 11 counties, more than any other county in Nebraska. Seven of them are in Nebraska and four are in South Dakota. The adjacent counties are:

 Bennett County, South Dakota - north
 Todd County, South Dakota - north
 Tripp County, South Dakota - northeast
 Brown County - east
 Keya Paha County - east
 Blaine County - southeast
 Grant County - south
 Thomas County - south
 Hooker County - south
 Sheridan County - west
 Oglala Lakota County, South Dakota - northwest

Demographics

As of the 2000 United States Census, of 2000, there were 6,148 people, 2,508 households, and 1,710 families in the county. The population density was 1.02 people per square mile (0.39/km2). There were 3,220 housing units at an average density of 0 per square mile (0/km2). The racial makeup of the county was 94.19% White, 0.07% Black or African American, 3.25% Native American, 0.42% Asian, 0.02% Pacific Islander, 0.33% from other races, and 1.72% from two or more races. 0.93% of the population were Hispanic or Latino of any race. 38.5% were of German, 12.6% English, 11.1% Irish and 7.3% American ancestry.

There were 2,508 households, out of which 31.70% had children under the age of 18 living with them, 57.90% were married couples living together, 6.90% had a female householder with no husband present, and 31.80% were non-families. 28.90% of all households were made up of individuals, and 12.70% had someone living alone who was 65 years of age or older. The average household size was 2.42 and the average family size was 2.98.

The county population contained 27.00% under the age of 18, 6.20% from 18 to 24, 25.50% from 25 to 44, 24.00% from 45 to 64, and 17.30% who were 65 years of age or older. The median age was 39 years. For every 100 females there were 98.80 males. For every 100 females age 18 and over, there were 93.60 males.

The median income for a household in the county was $29,268, and the median income for a family was $36,500. Males had a median income of $23,705 versus $17,277 for females. The per capita income for the county was $15,943. About 9.60% of families and 12.30% of the population were below the poverty line, including 13.40% of those under age 18 and 14.20% of those age 65 or over.

Communities

City
 Valentine (county seat)

Villages

 Cody
 Crookston
 Kilgore
 Merriman
 Nenzel
 Wood Lake

Census-designated place
 Brownlee

Other unincorporated communities

 DeWitty
 Elsmere
 Sparks
 Thatcher
 Barley

Notable ranches

 Abbott Ranch
 Bowring Ranch
 Spade Ranch
 Sunny Slope Ranch

Time zones

Cherry County residents observe two zones, the Central and Mountain time zones. The eastern third of the county, including county seat Valentine, is in the Central Time Zone, while the western two thirds, including Merriman, are in the Mountain Time Zone.

Politics
Cherry County voters are reliably Republican. In no national election since 1936 has the county selected the Democratic Party candidate. Republicans also hold a massive advantage in voter registration in the county, with 3,035 registered Republicans vs. just 407 registered Democrats.

See also
 National Register of Historic Places listings in Cherry County, Nebraska
 Lt. Samuel A. Cherry

References

External links
 County website

 
Nebraska counties
Counties in multiple time zones
1883 establishments in Nebraska
Populated places established in 1883